Swayamvar – Mika Di Vohti is an Indian reality show broadcast on Star Bharat Hosted by Shaan. The show premiered on 19 June 2022. It features Mika Singh, who tries to find a suitable life partner for himself from among the 12 contestants. Akanksha Puri was declared the Winner.

Contestants 

Bangle (Pyar Ka Nazrana) Winners

Nominations table

Production 
A music video titled Mika Di Vohti featuring Mika Singh released on 16 May 2022.

Promotion 
Singh appeared in StarPlus serial Anupamaa to promote his show.

Guest

See also
List of programs broadcast by Star Bharat

References

External links
 Swayamvar - Mika Di Vohti on Disney+ Hotstar

Indian reality television series
2022 Indian television seasons
Dating and relationship reality television series
Star Bharat original programming